Abdul Monem Khan (28 July 1899 – 13 October 1971)  was a Pakistani politician who was the longest serving governor of East Pakistan during 1962–1969.

Early life and education
Khan was born in Humayunpur village of Bajitpur Upazila, Kishoreganj to Kamar Ali Khan and Nasima Khatun. He studied in Mymensingh Zilla School graduating in 1916. He went on to Dhaka College and earned his bachelor of law degree from University of Calcutta in 1922. He got another law degree from the University of Dhaka in 1924.

Career 
In 1927, Khan joined the Mymensingh District Bar. He was part of the Muhammadan Sporting Club of Mymensingh. In 1930, he worked with Subhas Chandra Bose to carry out aid operations after a flood in North Bengal. In 1932, he became the assistant secretary of the Mymensingh Anjuman-i-Islamia. He became the founding secretary of Mymensingh branch of the All India Muslim League in 1935.

From 1946 to 1954, he served as the chairman of the Mymensingh District School Board. He was elected a member of the East Pakistan Muslim League Working Committee in 1947. He also went on to become Counselor at the All Pakistan Muslim League. He was elected to the Constituent Assembly of Pakistan and East Bengal Primary Education Board in 1948. He was appointed to the Bengal Defence Committee and the Provincial Armed Services Board in 1950.

Khan lost in the 1954 East Bengali legislative election. In 1962, he was elected uncontested a member of the National Assembly of Pakistan. He joined the cabinet led by President Ayub Khan becoming the Minister for Health, Labour and Social Welfare. During his ministry, seven medical colleges were established in East Pakistan and MBBS condensed course for the LMF doctors was introduced and the Institute of Postgraduate Medicine and Research (now Bangabandhu Sheikh Mujib Medical University) was established. After two months, on 28 October 1962, he was appointed as the governor of East Pakistan.

Governor of East Pakistan
Khan rendered services during the tidal wave of Chittagong in 1963 and again during the aftermath of the cyclone of 1965. He helped in the establishment of Jahangirnagar University. In July 1967, he converted Dighapatia Palace into Dighapatia Governor's House.

Khan, while the governor of East Pakistan, remained loyal to the Ayub regime which made him unpopular to the people of East Pakistan. Under the pressure of the 1969 mass student uprising, he was removed and replaced by Mirza Nurul Huda as the new governor on 24 March 1969.

Death and legacy
In the Bangladesh Liberation War, Khan supported the Pakistan army. On 13 October 1971, he was shot at his Banani residence by a Mukti Bahini member named Mozammel Hoque. Khan later died at Dhaka Medical College Hospital. Hoque later earned Bir Protik title for this act.

In 1974, the Government of Bangladesh allotted a  5.11-acre land for Khan's family at Banani near Banani Graveyard. In November 2016, Dhaka North City Corporation demolished structures on a land in Banani occupied, as per the order of the then mayor Annisul Huq, for over five decades by the family of Khan.

In July 2016, during a raid by Dhaka Metropolitan Police in the Kalyanpur area of Dhaka, nine suspected militants were killed. Among them, Aqifuzzaman Khan, was identified as the grandson of Monem Khan.

In January 2017, the Mymensingh District administration shut down a school, run by Nasreen Monem Khan, a daughter of Monem Khan. It was established at his house at Notun Bazar Saheb Ali Road in Mymensingh town in 1996.

In July 2017, Khan's nameplate was removed from Uttara Ganabhaban.

References

1899 births
1971 deaths
People from Kishoreganj District
Mymensingh Zilla School alumni
Dhaka College alumni
University of Calcutta alumni
University of Dhaka alumni
Pakistani MNAs 1962–1965
Government ministers of Pakistan
Governors of East Pakistan
Pakistan Movement activists from Bengal
People killed in the Bangladesh Liberation War
Assassinated Pakistani politicians
Burials at Banani Graveyard